Aleksandar Inđić (born 24 August 1995) is a Serbian chess grandmaster. He is a three-time Serbian Chess Champion.

Chess career
Born in 1995, Inđić earned his international master title in 2012 and his grandmaster title in 2013. He won the Serbian Chess Championship in 2014, 2018 and 2020.

In February 2018, he won the Portugal Open, scoring 7½/9. Anton Demchenko also scored 7½/9, but Inđić had the best tiebreak score. Also in February, he participated in the Aeroflot Open. He finished 38th out of 92, scoring 5/9 (+3–2=4). In March 2018, he competed in the European Individual Chess Championship. He placed 133rd, scoring 5½/11 (+4–4=3). He is the No. 1 ranked Serbian player as of January 2019.

References

External links

1995 births
Living people
Chess grandmasters
Serbian chess players
Sportspeople from Belgrade